KEZP (104.3 FM, "104.3 The Bridge") is an American radio station broadcasting a Christian AC format. The station is licensed to Bunkie, Louisiana and serves the Alexandria area.  The station is currently owned by Stephens Media Group, through licensee SMG-Alexandria, LLC.  Its studios are located in Pineville and its transmitter is in Lecompte, Louisiana.

The station previously aired an oldies music format before moving to a classic hits format (as "104.3 The Tiger"), then to classic rock in 2005 and alternative rock (as "Red 104-3") on August 4, 2008.

KEZP dropped the alternative music format on January 17, 2011, in favor of a news/talk format, branded as "The Truth." KEZP had a brief stint as EZ Praise 104.3 after the death of their GM Kim Jones in February 2013.  At Midnight on June 21st, EZ Praise turned into 104.3 The Bridge.

104.3 The Bridge is currently "local" between the hours of 9am and 10pm.  The Salem Radio Network syndicates the station between 10pm and 9am.

References

External links
Official website

Christian radio stations in Louisiana
Radio stations established in 1989
Mass media in Alexandria, Louisiana